Beau Daniel Baldwin (born May 21, 1972) is an American football coach and former player. He is the offensive coordinator at Arizona State. Previously, He was the head football coach at California Polytechnic State University, a position he held from December 2019 to 2022.  Baldwin previously served as the head football coach at Central Washington University in 2007 and at Eastern Washington University from 2008 to 2016. He led the 2010 Eastern Washington Eagles football team to an NCAA Division I Football Championship.  Baldwin was the offensive coordinator at University of California, Berkeley from 2017 to 2019.

Playing career
Baldwin graduated from Curtis Senior High School in University Place, Washington in 1990. He played at quarterback and earned three letters in football and three in baseball in his high school career. Baldwin helped lead Curtis to the 1989 Washington State AAA title in football.

Baldwin played college football at Central Washington University from 1990 to 1993. As a player, Baldwin was a two-time team captain and completed 121-of-197 passes for 1,655 yards and eight touchdowns. His career completion percentage of .614 is a school record. In a 38–35 win versus Simon Fraser in 1991, he set single-game school records for attempts (52), completions (32), yards (467), total plays (66) and total yards (550). He had a 6-yard touchdown pass with four seconds left to give the Wildcats the win.  In his last two seasons, Baldwin served as the backup to Jon Kitna.

After college, Baldwin spent a short time playing semi-pro football in Sweden. He played in a league that allowed only two American players per team, and they were also required to serve as assistant coaches, giving Baldwin a springboard into his coaching career back in the United States.

Assistant coaching career
Baldwin returned to Central Washington in 1994 as the quarterbacks coach for the Wildcats. He coached Jon Kitna, for whom he served as a backup just a year earlier. In 1995, Kitna, under the tutelage of Baldwin, helped lead Central Washington to a 10–3–1 record and the NAIA Division II National Championship. Kitna received All-American honors and later played 15 seasons in the National Football League (NFL).

Baldwin served as the quarterbacks coach at Central until 2002. In this time, Baldwin coached another All-American quarterback in Zak Hill, who led Central in 2002 to an 11–1 record and a top-five ranking at the NCAA Division II level. Hill later served under Baldwin as his quarterbacks coach when Baldwin took over as head coach at Eastern Washington.

In 2003, Baldwin went to Eastern Washington and spent four seasons with the Eagles as offensive coordinator and quarterbacks coach. In this time, Eastern Washington made two FCS Playoff appearances in 2004 and 2005. Baldwin also coached quarterback Erik Meyer, who won the Walter Payton Award in 2005, the first player from Eastern Washington to win the award.

Head coaching career

Central Washington
In 2007, Baldwin returned to Central Washington as the head coach of the Wildcats. In his only season at Central as head coach, Baldwin led Central to a 10–3 record and an appearance in the 2007 NCAA Division II playoffs, where they lost in the quarterfinals to two-time defending Division II National Champion Grand Valley State.

Baldwin's quarterback in 2007 was Mike Reilly, who was one of 24 national candidates for the Harlon Hill Trophy, given to the top player in NCAA Division II football. In 2007, Central Washington averaged 398.5 yards of total offense per game in 2007, including an average of 263.5 passing. Central averaged 31.4 points per game, including five games with at least 40 points.

Eastern Washington
Baldwin returned to Eastern Washington in 2008 as head coach, replacing Paul Wulff, whom Baldwin had served under as offensive coordinator and quarterbacks coach. In Baldwin's first year, Eastern Washington finished 6–5 overall and 5–3 in the Big Sky Conference.

In 2009, Eastern finished with an 8–4 record and advanced to the FCS Playoffs for the fourth time in six seasons, losing in the first round to Stephen F. Austin, 44–33.

In 2010, Baldwin led Eastern Washington to their best season in school history, leading the Eagles to a 13–2 record and the school's first national championship in football, winning the NCAA Division I Football Championship with a 20–19 come-from-behind victory over Delaware in the title game on January 7, 2011, in Frisco, Texas.

In 2011, the Eagles were ravaged by injuries en route to a 6–5 finish, missing the chance to defend their title in the FCS Playoffs. During this season, Eastern had its second Payton Award winner, quarterback Bo Levi Mitchell.

In the 2012 and 2013 seasons, Eastern amassed a 23–6 total record, winning two Big Sky Conference titles, including the school's first outright conference title in 2013. In these two seasons, Eastern made consecutive trips to the FCS Playoffs, losing both times in the semifinal round. Baldwin was named the Big Sky Conference Coach of the Year in both seasons.

In the 2013 season opening game, Baldwin led Eastern Washington to an upset win over FBS #25 Oregon State. Eastern's win is only the third time an FCS team has defeated a ranked FBS opponent in the history of college football. The win proved to be a milestone for Baldwin and the program, delivering a great deal of national media attention to the team and quarterback Vernon Adams, who passed for 411 yards and four touchdowns and ran for 107 yards with two more touchdowns in the victory.

Eastern Washington played the first college football game of the 2014 season at any division in the newly formed FCS Kickoff game against Sam Houston State. The game was nationally televised on ESPN, another milestone for the Eagle football program.

California
On January 16, 2017, Baldwin was hired as the offensive coordinator for California of the Pac-12 Conference under new head coach Justin Wilcox. In Baldwin's second season at Cal, the Bears’ offensive efficiency ranked as the second worst among all Power Five teams. Under Baldwin, the Cal offense led by their third-string quarterback was shutout for the first time in 20 years in its Pac-12 conference game against Utah on October 26, 2019. As the offensive coordinator for California, the Bears finished the 2017, 2018, and 2019 football seasons with the 11th, 12th, and 12th ranked offenses respectively out of 12 teams in the Pac-12 Conference in Yards Per Game. During those same seasons, the Bears finished with the 10th, 12th, and 12th ranked offenses respectively out of 12 teams in the Pac-12 Conference in Total Points Per Game under Baldwin's offensive leadership.

Cal Poly
On December 10, 2019, Baldwin was hired by Cal Poly as their new head coach, replacing the retired Tim Walsh. Cal Poly President Jeffrey Armstrong introduced Baldwin as head coach and stated on December 11, 2019, "We need football to rise to the level of academics". During the remainder of his tenure with the Mustangs, Baldwin coached his teams to only 4 wins, held a lead in only 9 games, and was outscored by halftime of those games by 429 points. Baldwin finished his time in San Luis Obispo with the fewest number of wins by any Cal Poly head coach through their first 25 games in school history. Baldwin had an 0–5 record versus in-state rivals UC Davis and Sacramento State as Cal Poly's head coach.

Head coaching record

References

External links
 California profile

1972 births
Living people
American football quarterbacks
Arizona State Sun Devils football coaches
Cal Poly Mustangs football coaches
California Golden Bears football coaches
Central Washington Wildcats football coaches
Central Washington Wildcats football players
Eastern Washington Eagles football coaches
Sportspeople from Santa Barbara, California
People from University Place, Washington
Coaches of American football from Washington (state)
Players of American football from Washington (state)